This is a list of firearm cartridges which have bullets in the  to  caliber range.

Length refers to the cartridge case length.
OAL refers to the overall length of the cartridge.
Bullet refers to the diameter of the bullet.

Some measurements are in millimetres, while others are measured in inches.

Self-loading pistol cartridges

Revolver cartridges

Rifle cartridges

Note: The .50 Sharps, Winchester and US Government cartridges are actually of 13 mm caliber

See also
.50 caliber handguns

References

Pistol and rifle cartridges